Nathan Horner ECA MLA (born 1980/1981) is a Canadian politician currently serving as Minister of Alberta Agriculture and Forestry, who was elected in the 2019 Alberta general election to represent the electoral district of Drumheller-Stettler in the 30th Alberta Legislature.

Horner is a member of the United Conservative Party. Horner is related to former Alberta MLA Doug Horner and MPs Jack Horner, Hugh Horner, Albert Horner and Norval Horner.

Upon the resignation of former Agricultural Minister Devin Dreeshen on November 5, 2021, Horner was appointed the minister of Agriculture and Forestry.

Electoral History

References

United Conservative Party MLAs
Living people
Year of birth uncertain
21st-century Canadian politicians
Horner family
1980 births